Myler is the surname of the following people:

Andrew Myler, Irish footballer
Cammy Myler, American luger
Frank Myler, English rugby league footballer
Richie Myler, English rugby league footballer
Stephen Myler, English rugby footballer
Tadeusz Myler (1949–2022), Polish entrepreneur and politician
Tony Myler, English rugby league footballer and coach